Flik Y'Self Off Y'Self is the second full-length album released by New Zealand band, HLAH.

Flik Y'Self Off Y'Self features three singles, 'Spanish Goat Dancer', 'Faster Hooves' and 'Chalkface', which features on The Not Nicomjool EP.

Track listing
 "Chalkface"
 "Spanish Goat Dancer"
 "Oily Rag"
 "Raw Sock"
 "Pops Pox n Vox"
 "Dirteater"
 "Hoarse"
 "Kissy Kissy"
 "Faster Hooves"
 "1 Pound 2 Pound"
 "Rabbit"
 "Nos Feratoo"
 "Theme To Nincomjool"
 "Velvet Kushin"

References
Discogs entry 
Audioculture page

1994 albums
HLAH albums